Massacre Island, Ontario is a small island in Lake of the Woods, a large lake between the United States and Canada.

It is believed that this island was the site where, on June 6, 1736, a mixed group of Teton-Lakota, Dakota, and Ojibwa killed 21 Frenchmen from New France including Jesuit missionary Jean-Pierre Aulneau as well as Jean Baptiste de La Vérendrye. Aulneau's intention was to pass the summer and fall of 1736 with the Assiniboine as a prelude to his mission to the Mandan. According to Catholic sources, La Vérendrye had decided at the beginning of June to send a brigade east to Michilimackinac for supplies and Aulneau chose to accompany the party for unknown reasons. When the group failed to return several search parties were dispatched. On June 22, 1736 word was received that the bodies of most of the party had been found decapitated with various other injuries including arrow wounds and knife cuts.

Today the site is marked by a large wooden cross in the middle of the island. There is some dispute whether this island was the actual site of the massacre.

References

Lake islands of Ontario
Lake of the Woods